"Together Forever" is a song performed and recorded by American singer Lisette Melendez and written by Carlos Berrios, Franc Reyes and Frank Malave in 1991. It was initially released as a 12-inch vinyl record and primarily used in dance clubs. It was later included on Melendez's 1991 album of the same name.

On February 16, 1991, the single reached position 31 on the Billboard Dance Club Songs chart and remained there for a total of nine weeks. On April 6, 1991, Melendez made it to the Billboard Hot 100, peaking at number 35. The single was one of the last freestyle songs to reach the Top 40 of the Billboard Hot 100. "Together Forever" is also credited as one of the few songs released in the 1990s that aided the revival of the "freestyle" genre's popularity, after the emergence of grunge.

The song was produced by Carlos "After Dark" Berrios, who also produced the 1991 song "Temptation" by Corina. This often explains the similarities in the two songs.

In 2008, the music video of the song was satirized by Marcos Mion on MTV.

Track listing

Chart performance

References

1990 singles
Lisette Melendez songs
1990 songs